Joana Ribeiro Costa (born 15 May 1981) is a Brazilian athlete who specializes in the pole vault. Her personal best jump is 4.50 metres from 2016. She represented her country at the 2007 World Championships failing to progress past the qualifying round. She also represented Brasil at the 2016 Olympic Games. She was born in São Paulo.

Competition record

References

External links
 

1981 births
Living people
Brazilian female pole vaulters
Athletes (track and field) at the 2007 Pan American Games
Athletes from São Paulo
Athletes (track and field) at the 2016 Summer Olympics
Olympic athletes of Brazil
Pan American Games athletes for Brazil
21st-century Brazilian women
20th-century Brazilian women